FC Mamer 32 is a football club based in Mamer, Luxembourg.

History
FC Mamer was founded in 1932.  The club plied its trade in the lower leagues of Luxembourgish football for most of its first sixty years, and only reached the third tier (the 'First Division') briefly in the 1970s, before relegation again.  In 1992, Mamer gained promotion to the First Division again, and solidified its position there. In 1999–2000, Mamer was promoted to the second league, the Division of Honour, but was relegated immediately. In 2004–05, Mamer reached the Division of Honour again.

In its first season back in the higher division, Mamer finished fourth. As the top league, the National Division, was expanding from twelve teams to fourteen, Mamer was given a chance of promotion by playing against US Rumelange, who had finished bottom of their National Division relegation group. Mamer won on penalties, and was promoted to the National Division for the 2006–07 season. However, they were relegated in their first season after finishing bottom of the fourteen-team league. In 2008–09, the club were relegated to the third division.

References

Organisations based in Mamer
Mamer 32
Association football clubs established in 1932
1932 establishments in Luxembourg